Events from the 1040s in England.

Incumbents
Monarch – Harold I (to 17 March 1040), Harthacanute (17 March 1840 to 8 June 1042), then Edward the Confessor

Events
 1040
 17 March – Harold Harefoot dies.
 June – Harthacnut lands at Sandwich, Kent, and becomes King of England.
 1041
 Rebellion in Worcester against Harthacnut's naval taxes.
 Siward, Earl of Northumbria, kills Eadwulf IV of Bamburgh with the connivance of Harthacnut, possibly incorporating Bernicia into his Earldom of Northumbria thereafter.
 Edward the Confessor returns from exile to become the heir of Harthacnut.
 1042
 8 June – Harthacnut collapses and soon after dies during the wedding celebrations of Tovi the Proud at Lambeth and is succeeded by his half-brother Edward the Confessor as King.
 Encomium Emmae, a biography of Queen Emma of Normandy, is completed.
 1043
 3 April – coronation of Edward the Confessor at Winchester Cathedral.
 16 November – Queen Emma accused of treason and her ally Stigand, Bishop of East Anglia, is dismissed.
 Earl Leofric of Mercia founds Coventry Abbey; according to legend, his wife Godiva rides naked through the town in protest at taxes to fund the abbey.
 1044
 King Edward pardons Emma and Stigand.
 1045
 Marriage of King Edward and Edith of Wessex.
 1046
 10 April – Leofric appointed Bishop of Crediton and Bishop of Cornwall.
 Earl Sweyn Godwinson is exiled after kidnapping the Abbess of Leominster during an invasion of south Wales.
Ealdred, Bishop of Worcester, leads troops on an unsuccessful punitive raid against Welsh leaders Gruffydd ap Rhydderch, Rhys ap Rhydderch and Gruffydd ap Llywelyn.
 Exeter Book of poetic riddles completed.
 1048
 Last Viking raid on England; unsuccessful raiders flee to Flanders.
 King Edward goes to war against Flanders, blockading the English Channel with a fleet based at Sandwich.
 1049
 Sweyn Godwinson returns from exile, murders his cousin, and is exiled again.

Births
 Cristina, daughter of Edward the Exile
 1045
Saint Margaret of Scotland daughter of Edgar Ætheling (died 1093)

Deaths
 1040
 17 March – King Harold Harefoot (born c. 1015)
 14 August – King Duncan I of Scotland (born ca. 1001)
 1042
 8 June – King Harthacanute (born 1018)

References